Namestovo is a rural locality (a village) in Botanovskoye Rural Settlement, Mezhdurechensky District, Vologda Oblast, Russia. The population was 52 as of 2002. There are 3 streets.

Geography 
Namestovo is located 38 km southwest of Shuyskoye (the district's administrative centre) by road. Khozhayevo is the nearest rural locality.

References 

Rural localities in Mezhdurechensky District, Vologda Oblast